Schmidt's dace (Leuciscus schmidti)  is a species of cyprinid fish from Issyk-kul Lake, Kyrgyzstan.

References

Leuciscus
Taxa named by Solomon Herzenstein
Fish described in 1896